The Men's Boxing Tournament at the 1983 Pan American Games was held in Caracas, Venezuela, from August 14 to August 29. The super heavyweight division was included for the first time.

Medal winners

Medal table

External links
 Amateur Boxing

Pan American Games
Boxing at the Pan American Games
Events at the 1983 Pan American Games